Iowa PBS, formerly Iowa Public Television (IPTV), is a network of Public Broadcasting Service (PBS) member stations in the U.S. state of Iowa. It is owned by the Iowa Public Broadcasting Board, an agency of the state education department which holds the licenses for all the PBS member stations in the state. Iowa PBS' headquarters are located at 6450 Corporate Drive in Johnston, Iowa, a suburb of Des Moines. The nine stations cover almost all of Iowa, as well as portions of Illinois, Minnesota and Nebraska.

History

Iowa is a pioneer in educational broadcasting; it is home to two of the oldest educational radio broadcast stations in the world, the University of Iowa's WSUI and Iowa State University's WOI.

The electrical engineering department at the State University of Iowa (SUI) in Iowa City demonstrated television with an exhibit at the Iowa State Fair in Des Moines on August 28, 1931. J. L. Potter supervised the project. At the conclusion of the Iowa State Fair, the television experiment was set up in the communications laboratory of the electrical engineering building at the University of Iowa in Iowa City.

By 1933, the University of Iowa received an FCC license for experimental TV station W9XK, later W9XUI providing twice a week video programming, with WSUI radio providing the audio channel. By 1939, the FCC allocated TV channels 1 and 12 for W9XUI.  This early attempt at educational broadcasting ended by December 1941, with the entrance of the United States into World War II.

The University of Iowa later applied for a construction permit for station WSUI-TV on channel 11 in February 1948.

The Federal Communications Commission (FCC) froze the granting of new television licenses, on September 30, 1948. The FCC, at the time, was swamped with hundreds of requests for licensing. It was creating a problem for allocation and causing interference issues. The FCC wanted time to study the issues and work towards a better overall solution.

The freeze, originally set to last just six months, was extended when the Korean War began. Plus, the issues the FCC was trying to resolve were complicated and many. It ended up taking four years to end the freeze.

The April 14, 1952 FCC “6th Report and Order” effectively lifted the freeze. The decisions had been made on all five dilemmas. In the end, a color standard was chosen, 242 channels were designated for educational non-commercial use, strict rules separated stations sharing channels, channel allocation was resolved with an assignment table, and the entire spectrum of UHF band channels was authorized for use.

In 1951, the university supported the reallocation of channel 11 to Des Moines for an educational television station there.

Meanwhile, Iowa State University's WOI-TV in Ames avoided the 1948 Freeze and began commercial broadcast operations in 1950 and carried some National Educational Television programming. Des Moines Public Schools applied for the channel 11 allocation and signed on KDPS-TV as the educational station for central Iowa in 1959. However, in the 1960s the only other areas of the state with a clear signal from an educational station were the southwest (from Nebraska ETV's KYNE-TV in Omaha), and the northwest (from South Dakota ETV's KUSD-TV in Vermillion).

In 1969, the state of Iowa bought KDPS-TV from the Des Moines Public Schools and changed its calls to KDIN-TV, intending it to be the linchpin of a statewide educational television network. As part of the state's ambition, it rebranded KDIN as the Iowa Educational Broadcasting Network.

The network's second station, KIIN-TV in Iowa City, joined IEBN in 1970 to expand statewide educational programming to eastern Iowa and northwestern Illinois. Soon afterward, IEBN became a charter member of PBS. By 1977 the newly renamed Iowa Public Broadcasting Network had eight full-power stations. The Iowa Public Television name was adopted in 1982 and began on-air January 1, 1983. In 2003, it purchased KQCT-TV in Davenport, which repeated the programming of Quad Cities PBS station WQPT-TV in the Iowa side of the Quad Cities. The calls were changed to KQIN.

IPTV was originally run by the state's General Services Department before Governor Terry Branstad signed a bill creating Iowa Public Television as a separate state agency on May 16, 1983. In 1986, IPTV became part of the state's Cultural Affairs Department, and on July 1, 1992, IPTV became part of the Iowa Department of Education.

Combined, the nine Iowa PBS stations reach almost all of Iowa and portions of the surrounding states of Illinois, Minnesota, Missouri, Nebraska, South Dakota, and Wisconsin.

On December 2, 2019, IPTV announced that it would rebrand as Iowa PBS in 2020, in alignment with PBS' new national brand identity.

Television stations
Nine full-power TV stations make up the network; all stations have callsigns beginning with the letter K, as licensed by the Federal Communications Commission (FCC), and ending in IN (standing for Iowa Network). Aside from their transmitters, the network's stations (except KDIN-TV) do not maintain any physical presence in their cities of license.

Translators

In 2012, an application was filed for a digital replacement translator to extend coverage of KRIN into Dubuque, but  this application is still pending.

Digital television

Subchannels
The digital signals of Iowa PBS' stations are multiplexed:

Analog-to-digital conversion
Iowa PBS (as IPTV) shut down its stations' analog signals on June 12, 2009, the official date in which full-power television stations in the United States transitioned from analog to digital broadcasts under federal mandate. The station's digital channel allocations post-transition are as follows:
 KBIN-TV shut down its analog signal, over UHF channel 32; the station's digital signal remained on its pre-transition UHF channel 33. Through the use of PSIP, digital television receivers display the station's virtual channel as its former UHF analog channel 32.
 KDIN-TV shut down its analog signal, over VHF channel 11; the station's digital signal relocated from its pre-transition UHF channel 50 to VHF channel 11.
 KHIN shut down its analog signal, over UHF channel 36; the station's digital signal remained on its pre-transition UHF channel 35. Through the use of PSIP, digital television receivers display the station's virtual channel as its former UHF analog channel 36.
 KIIN shut down its analog signal, over VHF channel 12; the station's digital signal relocated from its pre-transition UHF channel 45 to VHF channel 12.
 KQIN shut down its analog signal, over UHF channel 36; the station's digital signal remained on its pre-transition UHF channel 34. Through the use of PSIP, digital television receivers display the station's virtual channel as its former UHF analog channel 36.
 KRIN shut down its analog signal, over UHF channel 32; the station's digital signal remained on its pre-transition UHF channel 35. Through the use of PSIP, digital television receivers display the station's virtual channel as its former UHF analog channel 32.
 KSIN-TV shut down its analog signal, over UHF channel 27; the station's digital signal remained on its pre-transition UHF channel 28. Through the use of PSIP, digital television receivers display the station's virtual channel as its former UHF analog channel 27.
 KTIN shut down its analog signal, over UHF channel 21; the station's digital signal remained on its pre-transition UHF channel 25. Through the use of PSIP, digital television receivers display the station's virtual channel as its former UHF analog channel 21.
 KYIN shut down its analog signal, over UHF channel 24; the station's digital signal remained on its pre-transition UHF channel 18. Through the use of PSIP, digital television receivers display the station's virtual channel as its former UHF analog channel 24.

Late night programming
Starting August 31, 2013, Iowa PBS (as IPTV) had gone off-the-air nightly from midnight to 5 a.m. over-the-air due to budget concerns, reduced from a 24-hour schedule. Mediacom continued to carry the network in their markets with 24-hour programming due to their direct fiber connection from IPTV in Johnston to their Des Moines headend, which distributes the four IPTV channels statewide. The national satellite services carry the network's primary HD channel (IPTV.1) and have a fiber connection so the channel was available 24/7 to their subscribers. At the present time, they do not carry the three sub-channels.

The network restored over-the-air 24-hour service on January 15, 2019; late night programming mainly consists of the national PBS schedule.

Programming
Although Iowa PBS provides PBS programming and also coordinates several political debates during the Iowa Caucuses, it also produces original programs, such as:
 Iowa Press, a political panel discussion show.
 Iowa Ingredient, with host Charity Nebbe, highlighting various foods grown, raised and produced in Iowa.
 Iowa Outdoors, with hosts Scott Siepker and Kellie Kramer, highlighting outdoor recreation, environmental issues, conservation initiatives and Iowa's outdoor natural resources.
 Market to Market, a nationally distributed show about agribusiness.
 Iowa PBS Sports, a series of high school girls' championship events sanctioned by the IGHSAU including basketball, bowling, cross country, golf, soccer, softball, swimming and diving, tennis, track and field, and volleyball.

Dan Wardell is the host of the children's programming block, featuring shows such as Curious George, Sesame Street, and Kids Clubhouse Adventures.

Friends of Iowa PBS
In 1970, Friends of Iowa Public Television (Iowa Public Television Foundation Board) was created for the development, growth and support of Iowa PBS through the building of a strong statewide membership base. Its 65,000 member households across Iowa and bordering states contribute nearly 90% of the out-of-pocket costs for acquiring and producing general audience programming. When IPTV rebranded as Iowa PBS in December 2019, Friends of Iowa Public Television changed its name to Friends of Iowa PBS.

References
 IPTV History from the Iowa Public Television web site, accessed April 1, 2006

External links
Iowa PBS' official website

PBS member networks
Television stations in Iowa
Television channels and stations established in 1959
1959 establishments in Iowa
Johnston, Iowa